Banyan merchants is an expression used widely in the Indian Ocean trade to refer to Indian merchants who are clearly distinguished from others, by their clothing, by their religious and cultural dietary choices, and by the manner in which they conduct trade.

History 
The Banyan people are mentioned in the Periplus of the Erythraean Sea, through Indo-Roman trade relations, 
in Egypt and Sokotra, Dahlak Island and Suakim, Massawa, Muscat, Zansibar, Gulf of Aden, Aydhab, Hadramut, Syria, Persia, Europe. In Evliya Çelebi's Seyahatname, it is mentioned that the language of the Rumelian Roma people from Gümülcine (Komitini) has Banyan roots

References 

Foreign trade of India
Ethnic groups in India
Social institutions
Cultural conventions